Nugget Towers is a mountain ridge with a series of peaks, two primarily, the highest of which is 5,378-ft (1,639 m) elevation, and located on the southern periphery of the Juneau Icefield, in the Boundary Ranges of southeast Alaska. Although modest in elevation, relief is significant since the mountain rises 3,500 feet (1,067 m) above Nugget Creek's upper basin in less than one mile. Precipitation runoff from the mountain drains into Mendenhall Lake via Nugget Creek and Nugget Falls. This geographic feature's local name was reported in 1965 by U.S. Geological Survey.

Climate

Based on the Köppen climate classification, Nugget Towers is located in a subarctic climate zone with cold, snowy winters, and mild summers. Weather systems coming off the Gulf of Alaska are forced upwards by the Coast Mountains (orographic lift), causing heavy precipitation in the form of rainfall and snowfall. Temperatures can drop below −20 °C with wind chill factors below −30 °C. This climate supports the Mendenhall Glacier to the mountain's west, and Juneau Icefield to its north. The month of July offers the most favorable weather for viewing and climbing Nugget Towers.

See also

List of mountain peaks of Alaska
Geography of Alaska
Nugget Mountain

References

External links
 Weather forecast: Nugget Towers
 Flickr photo: Nugget Towers
Mountains of Alaska
Mountains of Juneau, Alaska
Boundary Ranges
North American 1000 m summits